Li Xiaodong is a Chinese Paralympic judoka. He represented China at the 2008 Summer Paralympics and at the 2012 Summer Paralympics. He won two medals: one of the bronze medals in the men's 60 kg event in 2008 and the silver medal in the men's 60 kg event in 2012.

At the 2010 Asian Para Games he won a gold medal in the men's -60 kg event.

References

External links 

 

Living people
Year of birth missing (living people)
Place of birth missing (living people)
Chinese male judoka
Judoka at the 2008 Summer Paralympics
Judoka at the 2012 Summer Paralympics
Medalists at the 2008 Summer Paralympics
Medalists at the 2012 Summer Paralympics
Paralympic silver medalists for China
Paralympic bronze medalists for China
Paralympic medalists in judo
Paralympic judoka of China
20th-century Chinese people
21st-century Chinese people